Un Nuevo Día (A New Day) is an American television morning show which aired on Telemundo from 2008 to 2021.

It originally premiered in 2008 as ¡Levántate! (Get Up!), which was produced from Telemundo's studios in Puerto Rico. In 2011, it re-located to Miami with a revamped on-air staff and a larger focus on entertainment content. In July 2012, the program was renamed Un Nuevo Día, after the addition of Adamari López as a new co-host.

In January 2021, Telemundo announced that Un Nuevo Día would be replaced by a new morning show, Hoy Día, beginning February 15, 2021.

History 
In May 2008, Telemundo announced that it would replace its existing morning show Cada Día (which had struggled in the ratings against Univision's dominant ¡Despierta América!) with a new program, ¡Levántate!  The program would be produced from WKAQ in Puerto Rico, and be hosted by Alan Tacher, Erika Garza and Rashel Diaz. The show launched on November 26, 2008.

In 2010, it was announced that Levantate! would be re-located to Telemundo's studios in Miami in 2011, in order to provide greater synergies with Telemundo's other operations, and allow it to be produced in high definition. It broadcast its first edition from Miami on February 28, 2011. At the same time, the program underwent a retool, with a new format that would feature a "balance of information and entertainment ", and a new on-air team featuring Rashel Diaz, Daniel Sarcos, Omar Germenos, Azucena Cierco, and news correspondent Ramon Zayas.

As Un Nuevo Dia 
On July 16, 2012, Telemundo rebranded Levantate! as Un Nuevo Dia; Puerto Rican actress Adamari López joined the program as an additional co-host.

In August 2013, Germenos announced that he would leave the program. Telemundo subsequently hired former Despierta América anchor Ana María Canseco. In 2014, another long-time Despierta América anchor, Neida Sandoval, joined Un Nuevo Dia. In 2016, Sandoval left the program after her contract with Telemundo was not renewed.

In 2015, Un Nuevo Día won the Daytime Emmy Award for Outstanding Morning Program in Spanish. The program would win the award again in 2017.

In May 2017, WNJU anchor Janice Bencosme joined the program as its new weather reporter. In June 2018, Guatemalan actor Héctor Sandarti joined the program as a new co-host.

In August 2020, María Celeste Arrarás and Rashel Díaz were laid off from Telemundo as part of a series of cuts by NBCUniversal, leaving Adamari López and Stephanie Himonidis as the remaining anchors.

Notable staff
 Rashel Díaz (20082020)
 Daniel Sarcos (20112018)
 Alessandra Villegas (20112014)
 Adamari Lopez (2012Present)
 Ana María Canseco (20132018)
 Diego Schoening (20132017)
Francisco Cáceres (2013-2021)
 Neida Sandoval (20142016) News
 Marco Antonio Regil (20182019)
 Héctor Sandarti (20182020)
 Raúl González (2014-2017)
 Stephanie “Chiquibaby” Himonidis (2019present)
 Adriana Martin (2018 present)
 Paulina Sodi (20172021) News anchor

Awards and nominations

References

External links
 Official website
 

Telemundo original programming
2008 American television series debuts
2021 American television series endings
2000s American television talk shows
2010s American television talk shows
2000s American television news shows
2010s American television news shows
Television morning shows in the United States
Noticias Telemundo